Events in the year 1982 in Japan.

Incumbents
Emperor: Hirohito (Emperor Shōwa)
Prime Minister: Zenko Suzuki (L–Iwate) until 27 November 1982, Yasuhiro Nakasone (L–Gunma)
 Chief Cabinet Secretary: Kiichi Miyazawa (L–Hiroshima) until November 27, Masaharu Gotōda (L–Tokushima)
 Chief Justice of the Supreme Court: Takaaki Hattori until September 30, Jirō Terata from October 1
 President of the House of Representatives: Hajime Fukuda (L–Fukui)
 President of the House of Councillors: Masatoshi Tokunaga (L–national)
 Diet sessions: 96th (regular session opened in December 1981, to August 21), 97th (extraordinary, November 26 to December 25), 98th (regular, December 28 to 1983, May 26)

Governors
Aichi Prefecture: Yoshiaki Nakaya 
Akita Prefecture: Kikuji Sasaki 
Aomori Prefecture: Masaya Kitamura 
Chiba Prefecture: Takeshi Numata 
Ehime Prefecture: Haruki Shiraishi 
Fukui Prefecture: Heidayū Nakagawa 
Fukuoka Prefecture: Hikaru Kamei 
Fukushima Prefecture: Isao Matsudaira 
Gifu Prefecture: Yosuke Uematsu 
Gunma Prefecture: Ichiro Shimizu 
Hiroshima Prefecture: Toranosuke Takeshita 
Hokkaido: Naohiro Dōgakinai 
Hyogo Prefecture: Tokitada Sakai
Ibaraki Prefecture: Fujio Takeuchi 
Ishikawa Prefecture: Yōichi Nakanishi 
Iwate Prefecture: 
Kagawa Prefecture: Tadao Maekawa 
Kagoshima Prefecture: Kaname Kamada 
Kanagawa Prefecture: Kazuji Nagasu 
Kochi Prefecture: Chikara Nakauchi  
Kumamoto Prefecture: Issei Sawada 
Kyoto Prefecture: Yukio Hayashida 
Mie Prefecture: Ryōzō Tagawa 
Miyagi Prefecture: Sōichirō Yamamoto 
Miyazaki Prefecture: Suketaka Matsukata 
Nagano Prefecture: Gorō Yoshimura 
Nagasaki Prefecture: Kan'ichi Kubo (until 1 March); Isamu Takada (starting 1 March)
Nara Prefecture: Shigekiyo Ueda 
Niigata Prefecture: Takeo Kimi 
Oita Prefecture: Morihiko Hiramatsu 
Okayama Prefecture: Shiro Nagano 
Okinawa Prefecture: Junji Nishime 
Osaka Prefecture: Sakae Kishi
Saga Prefecture: Kumao Katsuki 
Saitama Prefecture: Yawara Hata 
Shiga Prefecture: Masayoshi Takemura 
Shiname Prefecture: Seiji Tsunematsu 
Shizuoka Prefecture: Keizaburō Yamamoto 
Tochigi Prefecture: Yuzuru Funada 
Tokushima Prefecture: Shinzo Miki 
Tokyo: Shun'ichi Suzuki 
Tottori Prefecture: Kōzō Hirabayashi 
Toyama Prefecture: Yutaka Nakaoki
Wakayama Prefecture: Shirō Kariya  
Yamagata Prefecture: Seiichirō Itagaki 
Yamaguchi Prefecture: Toru Hirai 
Yamanashi Prefecture: Kōmei Mochizuki

Events 

January 6 - According to Japan Coast Guard official confirmed report, a fishing boat, Akebono Maru No.28 sank with high waves caused by stormy weather in Bering Sea, 32 crew were perished.
February 8 - A fire at the Hotel New Japan in Tokyo kills 33.
February 9 - Japan Airlines Flight 350 crashes in Tokyo Bay, killing 24 on board.
March 21 – According to Japanese government official report, twelve climbers were human fatalities, due suffer heavy fog and avalanche hit on Mount Yatsu, Nagano Prefecture. 
April 1 - The 500 yen coin is introduced.
July 23 - A heavy torrential rain, landslide hit in central Kyushu Island, according to Fire and Disaster Management Agency confirmed report, total 326 person lives, including 299 in Nagasaki area.
August 2 - Typhoon Bess, according to Fire and Disaster Management Agency confirmed report, 95 person fatalities.
September 1 – A  first edition of Dōshin Sports (道新スポーツ), a subsidiary of Hokkaidō Shinbun (北海道新聞) was published in Sapporo.
September 24 - A Ministry of Education official is arrested on bribery charges.
Date unknown
Yamaha bravo snowmobile is introduced and begins production.

Popular culture

Arts and entertainment
In anime, the winners of the Anime Grand Prix were the TV series Six God Combination Godmars for best work, an episode of Urusei Yatsura for best episode, Takeru Myoujin from Six God Combination Godmars and voiced by Yū Mizushima for best character, Toshio Furukawa for best voice actor, Mami Koyama for best voice actress and Macross, the opening for the TV series Super Dimension Fortress Macross and sung by Makoto Fujiwara for best song. For a list of anime released in 1982 see :Category:1982 anime.

In film, Fall Guy won the Best Film award at the Japan Academy Prize, the Blue Ribbon Awards and the Hochi Film Award. Exchange Students won the Best Film award at the Yokohama Film Festival. For a list of Japanese films released in 1982 see Japanese films of 1982.

In manga, Gakuto Retsuden by Motoka Murakami (shōnen), Yōkihi-den by Suzue Miuchi (shōjo) and Karyūdo no Seiza by Machiko Satonaka (general) were the winners of the Kodansha Manga Award. The winners of the Shogakukan Manga Award were Tsuribaka Nisshi by Jūzō Yamasaki and Ken'ichi Kitami (general), Miyuki and Touch by Mitsuru Adachi (shōnen or shōjo) and Game Center Arashi and Kon'nichiwa! Mi-com by Mitsuru Sugaya (children). Gin no Sankaku by Moto Hagio won the Seiun Award for Best Comic of the Year. For a list manga released in 1982 see :Category:1982 Manga.

In music, the 33rd Kōhaku Uta Gassen was won by the Red Team (women). They were: Junko Mihara, Naoko Kawai, Aming, Mizue Takada, Seiko Matsuda, Kyoko Suizenji, Sugar, Naoko Ken, Los Indios and  Sylvia, Mina Aoe, Chiyoko Shimakura, Mieko Makimura, Ikue Sakakibara, Rumiko Koyanagi, Junko Sakurada, Miyuki Kawanaka, Hiromi Iwasaki, Masako Mori, Sayuri Ishikawa, Sachiko Kobayashi, Aki Yashiro and Harumi Miyako. Hiromi Iwasaki won the Nippon Television Music Festival and the Japan Music Awards with her song Madonna tachi no lullaby. The Japan Record Award was won by Takashi Hosokawa with his song Kita Sakaba. The May edition of the Yamaha Popular Song Contest was won by Aming with their song Matsuwa. Seiko Matsuda won the FNS Music Festival with Nobara no Etude.

In television, for dramas initially broadcast in 1982 see: List of Japanese television dramas#1982. For more events see: 1982 in Japanese television.

Sports
At the 1982 Asian Games Japan ranked second in the number of gold medals with 57 and tied with China in the total medal count with 153.

In badminton, Hiroyuki Hasegawa won the Men's singles and Sumiko Kitada the Women's singles at the Japanese National Badminton Championships (for the other results see the article).

In baseball, the Seibu Lions won the Japan Series 4-3 against the Chunichi Dragons. The MVP in the Central League was Takayoshi Nakao and in the Pacific League Hiromitsu Ochiai. At the Japanese High School Baseball Championship Ikeda won 12-2 against Hiroshima.

In basketball, Japan hosted the ABC Championship for Women 1982 that was won by Korea, with the Japanese team winning the third place. The All Japan Intercollegiate Basketball Championship was won by Nippon Sport Science.

In chess, Hiroyuki Nishimura (men's) and Naoko Takemoto (women's) were the winners of the Japanese Chess Championship.

In figure skating, the winners of the 1981–1982 Japan Figure Skating Championships were Fumio Igarashi (men), Mariko Yoshida (women) and Noriko Sato and Tadayuki Takahashi in ice dancing.

In golf, Yoshitaka Yamamoto won the NST Niigata Open, Hideto Shigenobu won the Kansai Pro Championship, Takashi Kurihara won the Hiroshima Open, Masahiro Kuramoto won the Japan PGA Championship, Teruo Sugihara won the Kansai Open and Akira Yabe won the Japan Open Golf Championship.

In football (soccer) Japan hosted the 1982 Intercontinental Cup between C.A. Peñarol and Aston Villa F.C. Peñarol won 2-0. Mitsubishi Motors (currently the Urawa Red Diamonds) won the 1982 Japan Soccer League. Yamaha Motor Company (currently the Júbilo Iwata) won the Second Division of the Soccer League and was promoted to the First Division. It also won the Emperor's Cup. For the champions of the regional leagues see: Japanese Regional Leagues 1982.

Births

January to June
 January 5 
Norichika Aoki, baseball player
Maki Tsukada, judoka
 January 7 - Ryang Yong-Gi, Japanese-born football player
 January 12 - Ayumi Murata, singer, voice actor
 January 20 - Takatoshi Uchida, football player
 January 21 – Go Shiozaki, professional wrestler
 January 25 – Sho Sakurai, singer
 January 26 – Yasushi Tsujimoto, wrestler
 January 30 - Daiki Iwamasa, football player
 February 7 - Osamu Mukai, actor
 February 9 – Ami Suzuki, singer
 February 17 - Satoko Mabuchi, softball player
 February 18 - Akiko Chubachi, model
 February 20 - Ryosei Konishi, actor, voice actor
 March 7  – Erika Yamakawa, gravure idol, talent
 March 10 - Shin Koyamada, actor, martial artist, philanthropist
 March 12 - Hisato Satō, football player
 March 15 - Yōko Maki, actress
 March 19 – Yoshikaze Masatsugu, sumo wrestler
 March 24  – Kenichirou Ohashi, voice actor
 March 25 - Kayoko Fukushi, long-distance runner
 March 25 - Yoshikazu Kotani, actor, singer
 March 27 - Kurara Chibana, model
 April 3  – Kasumi Nakane, gravure idol
 April 3 - Hiraku Hori, kickboxer, martial artist
 April 20 
Sayaka Kamiya, actress and model
Keiichiro Nagashima, speed skater
 May 4 - Norihito Kobayashi, Nordic combined skier
 May 13  – Yoko Kumada, gravure idol
 May 14  – Ai Shibata, swimmer
 May 15  - Tatsuya Fujiwara, actor
 May 21 - Kota Ibushi, professional wrestler
 May 24 - Hiroyasu Tanaka, baseball player
 May 26  – Yoko Matsugane, model
 May 30 - Asahi Uchida, actor
 June 4 - Soshi Tanaka, figure skater
 June 9 - Yoshito Ōkubo, football player
 June 27  – Takeru Shibaki, actor

July to December
 July 3 - Cyber Kong, professional wrestler
 July 5 - Junri Namigata, tennis player
 July 9  – Sakon Yamamoto, racing driver
 July 21 - Mao Kobayashi, newscaster and actress (d. 2017)
 July 28 - Yoshiyuki Kamei, baseball player
 August 4 - Seiichi Uchikawa, baseball player
 August 6 - Hiroki Hirako, speed skater
 August 15 - Tsuyoshi Hayashi, actor
 August 16 - Tomohiro Ito, sprinter
 August 24 - Daiki Hata, mixed martial artist
 August 24 - Tetsu Sawaki, actor
 August 27 - Tatsuyuki Tomiyama, football player
 September 3 – Kaori Natori, singer
 September 9 – Ai Otsuka, singer, songwriter, pianist and actress
 September 12 – Nana Ozaki, gravure idol
 September 19 - Shoji Sato, badminton player
 September 22 – Kosuke Kitajima, swimmer
 September 23 - Ryuichi Kiyonari, motorcycle road racer
 September 28 - Takeshi Aoki, football player
 October 4 - Takashi Kitano, football player
 October 28 - Mai Kuraki, singer-songwriter, producer
 November 2 – Kyoko Fukada, actress, singer
 November 5 - Saho Harada, synchronized swimmer
 November 5 - Akinori Nakagawa, singer, songwriter, actor
 November 6 - Daisuke Watanabe, actor
 November 8 - Aisa Senda, singer, actress, presenter
 November 13 – Kumi Koda, singer
 November 15 - Rio Hirai, Japanese actress
 November 18 - Masanori Kanehara, mixed martial artist
 November 21 - Shingo Takagi, professional wrestler
 November 27 - Tatsuya Tanaka, football player
 December 12 - Noriyuki Kanzaki, figure skater
 December 12 - Ai Kato, actress, model
 December 13 - Eita, actor
 December 18 - Aya Yasuda, luger
 December 24 – Masaki Aiba, singer
 December 25 - Yasuhiro Kido, kickboxer, martial artist
 December 29 - Noriaki Kinoshita, American football player

Deaths
 February 13 - Chiemi Eri, singer, actress
 February 26 - Teinosuke Kinugasa, actor, film director
 March 12 - Genzō Kitazumi, photographer
 March 16 - Arihiro Fujimura, actor, voice actor
 May 1 - Torajiro Saito, film director
 September 22 - Shin Saburi, actor
 December 28 - Shin Kishida, actor

See also
 1982 in Japanese television
 List of Japanese films of 1982

References

External links

 
Japan
Years of the 20th century in Japan